Ithystenus curvidens is a species of  straight-snouted weevils belonging to the family Brentidae.

Distribution 
This species can be found in Papua New Guinea, Bismarck Archipelago: New Britain; Woodlark Island; West Papua; Aru Islands.

References 

 Biolib
 Alessandra Sforzi  The Straight-snouted Weevils (Coleoptera: Curculionoidea, Brentidae) of Papua Indonesia
 Richard Kleine Checklist of the brentidae of Oceania
 Gregory P. Setliff  Annotated checklist of weevils from the Papuan region

Brentidae
Beetles described in 1855
Insects of Papua New Guinea